Karanja Assembly constituency is one of the 288 constituencies of Maharashtra Vidhan Sabha and one of the three which are located in the Washim district.

It is a part of the Yavatmal-Washim (Lok Sabha constituency) with the adjoining Yavatmal district along with five other Vidhan Sabha assembly constituencies, viz. Washim(SC), Ralegaon (ST), Yavatmal(ST), Digras and Pusad.

As per orders of Delimitation of Parliamentary and Assembly constituencies Order, 2008, No. 35 Karanja Assembly constituency is composed of the following: 1. Karanja Tehsil, 2. Manora Tehsil  of the district.

Members of Legislative assembly

See also
Karanja (disambiguation)

Notes

Assembly constituencies of Maharashtra